D765 may refer to:

 NEC µPD765, a floppy-controller manufactured by NEC
 A CSX Transportation trash train running between Derwood and Dickerson, Maryland, USA
 A Route National in France, see Quimper